The African Beach Games is a continental multi-sport event held among athletes from the Africa. The Games are organised under the governance of the Association of National Olympic Committees of Africa (ANOCA). The Games were announced by the ANOCA President, Lassana Palenfo, in May 2015.

All of the competing nations are for the African continent. The first Games were held on the island of Sal, Cape Verde in June 2019.

In October 2021, Baseball5 was added as a full medal sport for the 2023 edition.

Editions

See also
Asian Beach Games

References 

 
Beach sports competitions
Multi-sport events in Africa
2019 establishments in Africa
Recurring sporting events established in 2019